Alpha-endosulfine is a protein that in humans is encoded by the ENSA gene.

The protein encoded by this gene belongs to a highly conserved cAMP-regulated phosphoprotein (ARPP) family. This protein was identified as an endogenous ligand for the sulfonylurea receptor, ABCC8/SUR1. ABCC8 is the regulatory subunit of the ATP-sensitive potassium (KATP) channel, which is located on the plasma membrane of pancreatic beta cells and plays a key role in the control of insulin release from pancreatic beta cells. This protein is thought to be an endogenous regulator of KATP channels. In vitro studies have demonstrated that this protein modulates insulin secretion through the interaction with KATP channel, and this gene has been proposed as a candidate gene for type 2 diabetes. At least eight alternatively spliced transcript variants encoding distinct isoforms have been observed.

References

Further reading